Reijo Nykänen (30 June 1930 – 23 January 2019) was a Finnish wrestler. He competed in the men's Greco-Roman bantamweight at the 1956 Summer Olympics.

References

External links
 

1930 births
2019 deaths
Finnish male sport wrestlers
Olympic wrestlers of Finland
Wrestlers at the 1956 Summer Olympics
People from Joroinen
Sportspeople from South Savo